Allan Gilmour (29 September 1805 – 18 November 1884) was a businessman in the shipping and timber industries and worked for the family firm in Britain and Canada. He worked for a firm established by his uncle Allan Gilmour Sr.

Biography 
Allan was born on September 29, 1805 at Craigton, Mearns (Strathclyde), Scotland, the son of John Gilmour, a farmer, and Margaret Urie.  In 1819, he was hired as a clerk by Pollok, Gilmour and Company, a firm established by his uncle Allan Gilmour Sr. and partners John and Arthur Pollok.

In 1821, he was promoted to clerk in the company's booming Miramichi, New Brunswick branch (Gilmour, Rankin & Co). In 1824, he transferred to a new branch in Bathurst, New Brunswick, and in 1826 joined the Saint John, New Brunswick operation (Robert Rankin and Co.).  In 1828, he joined a new venture, Allan Gilmour and Company, a partnership established by Allan, his uncle (Allan Gilmour, Sr), and William Ritchie of Montreal.

He died in Glasgow, Scotland.

References
 Biography at the Dictionary of Canadian Biography Online

1805 births
1884 deaths
Canadian businesspeople